Illi (also, Illi Karakilisa) is a town in the Shirak Province of Armenia.

References 

Populated places in Shirak Province